Cotu may refer to several villages in Romania:

 Cotu, a village in Cuca Commune, Argeș County
 Cotu, a village in Uda Commune, Argeș County
 Cotu, a village in Copălău Commune, Botoşani County
 Cotu, a village in Breasta Commune, Dolj County
 Cotu Băii, a village in Fântâna Mare Commune, Suceava County
 Cotu Ciorii, a village in C. A. Rosetti Commune, Buzău County
 Cotu Dobei, a village in Fântânele Commune, Suceava County
 Cotu Grosului, a village in Filipești Commune, Bacău County
 Cotu lui Ivan, a village in Golăiești Commune, Iași County
 Cotu Lung and Cotu Mihalea, villages in Siliștea Commune, Brăila County
 Cotu Morii, a village in Popricani Commune, Iași County
 Cotu Malului, a village in Leordeni Commune, Argeș County
 Cotu Miculinţi, a village in Coțușca Commune, Botoşani County
 Cotu Văii, a village in Albești Commune, Constanța County
 Cotu Vameş, a village in Horia Commune, Neamț County

COTU may refer to:
DC Comics' Challengers of the Unknown
Cities of the Underworld